Rectipilus is a genus of cyphelloid fungi in the family Marasmiaceae. The widespread genus contains nine species. It was circumscribed by Reinhard Agerer in 1973.

See also

List of Marasmiaceae genera

References

External links

Marasmiaceae
Agaricales genera